The Emperor's Old Clothes is a 1923 German silent film directed by Franz Seitz and starring Dary Holm, Ernst Rückert and Fritz Greiner.

The film's sets were designed by the art directors Kurt Dürnhöfer and Karl Machus.

Cast
 Dary Holm
 Ernst Rückert
 Fritz Greiner
 Rudolf Basil
 Lili Dominici
 Frau Thoma
 Max Weydner

References

Bibliography
 Alfred Krautz. International directory of cinematographers, set- and costume designers in film, Volume 4. Saur, 1984.

External links

1923 films
Films of the Weimar Republic
German silent feature films
Films directed by Franz Seitz
German black-and-white films
1920s German films